Lloyd R. Roundtree Seaplane Facility Seaplane Base  is a state-owned public-use seaplane base located in Petersburg, a city in the Petersburg Borough of the U.S. state of Alaska.

Facilities and aircraft 
Lloyd R. Roundtree Seaplane Facility has one landing area (NE/SW) measuring 9,000 x 1,100 feet (2,743 x 335 m). For the 12-month period ending August 6, 1995, the airport had 7,900 aircraft operations, an average of 21 per day: 75% air taxi and 25% general aviation.

References

External links 
 FAA Alaska airport diagram (GIF)

Airports in Petersburg Borough, Alaska
Seaplane bases in Alaska